The Millrace Site, RI-1039 is an archaeological site near Scituate, Rhode Island.

The site was added to the National Register of Historic Places on September 12, 1985. Publication of the location by the United States government is restricted under the Archaeological Resources Protection Act of 1979.

See also
 List of burial mounds in the United States
 Historic preservation
 History of Rhode Island
 Mound builders
 Native Americans in the United States
 Protected area

References

External links
 
 

Scituate, Rhode Island
National Register of Historic Places in Providence County, Rhode Island
Archaeological sites on the National Register of Historic Places in Rhode Island